Closing Numbers is a 1993 drama film directed by Stephen Whittaker, written by David Cook and starring Tim Woodward, Jane Asher and Jamie Glover. It was first broadcast on Channel 4 on 2 November 1993.

References 

1993 television films
1993 films
Films directed by Stephen Whittaker
1990s English-language films